Eddie Phillips (9 November 1911 in Bow, London – 2 March 1995 in London, England) was an English boxer. He was the youngest of five children. At the age of sixteen he became a charabanc driver taking visitors on day outings. He started boxing at the age of eighteen. In 1934, he married Marion Oakley. They had three children, Edward born in 1935, Derek in 1937 and Stephanie born in 1940. Stephanie had two boys Marcus & Gregory Clifford. Gregory had 4 children. Bradley Clifford, Ryan Clifford, Kyle Clifford & Sian Clifford.

He was called up for the Royal Air Force in 1940 and reached the rank of corporal. Due to illness he left in 1943.

During his career as a boxer he fought 42 bouts, winning 32 fights with seventeen K.Os, six losses, three draws and 1 no contest (32-6-3). He won the British Light Heavyweight championship belt in 1935.

In the early 1940s he made two films, My Learned Friend starring Will Hay in 1943 and Champagne Charlie in 1944. He was a publican of The Lord Tredegar and then the Vicar of Wakefield both of which were situated in the East End.

Career 
Eddie Phillips made his debut in December 1929, the exact date is not known. He fought to a draw with Reg Palmer at the Casino Club in Rochester, Kent. 

May 1931, Tony Arpino, Olympia London.
February 1932, Leo Bandias, Holborn Stadium, London.
February 1932, Billy Alleck, Crystal Palace, London.
March 1932, Bob Carvill, Holborn Stadium, London.
April 1932, Bill Partridge, Bow, London.
September 1932, Jack O'Malley, Royal Albert Hall, London.
March 1933, Len Harvey, Royal Albert Hall, London.
June 1933, Len Harvey, Olympia, Kensington.
February 1934, Tommy Farr, Holborn Stadium, London.
February 1934, Eddie Peirce, White City Stadium, Yorkshire.
April 1934, Ben Foored, Royal Albert Hall, London.
June 1934, Tommy Farr, Wandsworth Stadium, London.
February 1935, Tommy Farr, Mountain Ash, Wales.
May 1935, Charlie Bundy, White City, Cardiff, Wales.
June 1935, Eddie Wenstob, Wembley Stadium, London.
October 1935, Eddie Wenstob, Wembley Stadium, London.
October 1935, Len Harvey, Millbay Rinkeries, Devon.
November 1936, Jim Wilde, Empire Pool, Wembley.
April 1937, Jock McAvoy, Empire Pool, Wembley.
August 1937, Alex Bell, Devonshire Club, Hackney.
November 1937, Arno Kölblin, Harringay Arena, Harringay.
June 1938, Ben Foorde, Harringay Arena, Harringay.
September 1938, Jack Doyle, Harringay Arena, Harringay.
December 1938, Len Harvey, Harringay Arena, Harringay.
September 1939, Jack Doyle, White City Stadium, London.
September 1945, Olle Tandberg, Royal Albert Hall, London.

For a while he did some wrestling after his boxing career. He also did an exhibition fight with Joe Lewis. He died in 1995, leaving his wife, children, and grandchildren, and great grandchildren.

References

External links

1911 births
1995 deaths
English male boxers
People from Bow, London
Boxers from Greater London